STS-75 was a 1996 NASA Space Shuttle mission, the 19th mission of the Columbia orbiter.

Crew

Allen, Hoffman, Nicollier and Chang-Díaz had previously been members of the STS-46 crew, which had flown the TSS-1 experiment in 1992.

Mission objective

Tethered Satellite System
The primary objective of STS-75 was to carry the Tethered Satellite System Reflight (TSS-1R) into orbit and to deploy it spaceward on a conducting tether. The mission also flew the United States Microgravity Payload (USMP-3) designed to investigate materials science and condensed matter physics.

The TSS-1R mission was a reflight of TSS-1 which was flown onboard Space Shuttle Atlantis on STS-46 in July/August 1992. The Tether Satellite System circled the Earth at an altitude of 296 kilometers, placing the tether system within the rarefied electrically charged layer of the atmosphere known as the ionosphere.

Over  of the tether were deployed (over a period of 5 hours) before the tether broke. Many pieces of floating debris were produced by the plasma discharge and rupture of the tether, and some collided with it. The satellite remained in orbit for a number of weeks and was easily visible from the ground.

The electric conductor of the tether was a copper braid wound around a nylon (Nomex) string. It was encased in teflon-like insulation, with an outer cover of kevlar, inside a nylon (Nomex) sheath. The culprit turned out to be the innermost core, made of a porous material which, during its manufacture, trapped many bubbles of air, at atmospheric pressure.

Later vacuum-chamber experiments suggested that the unwinding of the reel uncovered pinholes in the insulation. That in itself would not have caused a major problem, because the ionosphere around the tether, under normal circumstance, was too rarefied to divert much of the current. However, the air trapped in the insulation changed that. As air bubbled out of the pinholes, the high voltage of the nearby tether, about 3500 volts, converted it into a relatively dense plasma (similar to the ignition of a fluorescent tube), and therefore made the tether a much better conductor of electricity. This plasma diverted to the metal of the shuttle and from there to the ionospheric return circuit. That current was enough to melt the cable.

The specific TSS-1R mission objectives were: characterize the current-voltage response of the TSS-orbiter system, characterize the satellite's high-voltage sheath structure and current collection process, demonstrate electric power generation, verify tether control laws and basic tether dynamics, demonstrate the effect of neutral gas on the plasma sheath and current collection, characterize the TSS radio frequency and plasma wave emissions and characterize the TSS dynamic-electrodynamic coupling.

TSS-1R Science Investigations included: TSS Deployer Core Equipment and Satellite Core Equipment (DCORE/SCORE), Research on Orbital Plasma Electrodynamics (ROPE), Research on Electrodynamic Tether Effects (RETE), Magnetic Field Experiment for TSS Missions (TEMAG), Shuttle Electrodynamic Tether System (SETS), Shuttle Potential and Return Electron Experiment (SPREE), Tether Optical Phenomena Experiment (TOP), Investigation of Electromagnetic Emissions by the Electrodynamic Tether (EMET), Observations at the Earth's Surface of Electromagnetic Emissions by TSS (OESSE), Investigation and Measurement of Dynamic Noise in the TSS (IMDN), Theoretical and Experimental Investigation of TSS Dynamics (TEID) and the Theory and Modeling in Support of Tethered Satellite Applications (TMST).

Other mission objectives
The USMP-3 payload consisted of four major experiments mounted on two Mission Peculiar Experiment Support Structures (MPESS) and three Shuttle Mid-deck experiments. The experiments were: Advanced Automated Directional Solidification Furnace (AADSF), Material pour l'Etude des Phenomenes Interessant la Solidification sur Terre et en Orbite (MEPHISTO), Space Acceleration Measurement System (SAMS), Orbital Acceleration Research Experiment (OARE), Critical Fluid Light Scattering Experiment (ZENO) and Isothermal Dendritic Growth Experiment (IDGE).

Alternating use of bunk bed
Astronauts Jeffrey A. Hoffman and Scott J. Horowitz, both Jewish, had alternating use of the same bunk bed, to which Hoffman attached, upon Horowitz's request, a mezuzah, using Velcro.

Operating system
STS-75 also was the first use of an operating system based on the Linux kernel on orbit. An older Digital Unix program, originally on a DEC AlphaServer, was ported to run Linux on a laptop. The next use of Linux was a year later, on STS-83.

Fictional STS-75 mission
STS-75 was the shuttle mission described in the fictional NASA Document 12-571-3570, although this document was disseminated several years before STS-75 was launched. The document purports to report on experiments to determine effective sexual positions in microgravity. Astronomer and scientific writer Pierre Kohler mistook this document for fact and is responsible for a major increase in its redistribution in the early 21st century. Conspiracy theories first made in the early beginnings of the Shuttle era of sex in space were suddenly made rampant again, causing a minor press debacle among tabloids.

References

External links

 
 NASA mission summary 
 STS-75 Video Highlights 
 

STS-075
Spacecraft launched in 1996